Byron Wesley, Jr. (born December 26, 1992) is an American professional basketball player for Antibes Sharks of the LNB Pro B. He played college basketball for USC and Gonzaga.

High school career
As a freshman, he played for his father at Rialto High School in Rialto, CA.  As a sophomore, Wesley attended Cajon High School in San Bernardino, California where he played varsity basketball as a sophomore in 2008–09 for the Cowboys and coach Randy Murray. In 2009, Wesley transferred to Etiwanda High School and coach Dave Kleckner in Rancho Cucamonga, California. As a junior playing for the Eagles in 2009–10, he averaged 18.8 points per game, scoring 25 or more points 10 times in leading the team to narrow losses to Mater Dei in the CIF Southern Section 1-AA finals and to Long Beach Poly in the State Southern Regional quarter-finals.

As a senior at Etiwanda in 2010–11, Wesley averaged 19.2 points and was also named to the first-team Best in the West squad by the Long Beach Press-Telegram and was named Baseline Conference MVP for the second consecutive season. He led the Eagles to a 29–4 record, losing to Long Beach Poly in the round of 16 in the California State Championships.

College career
Wesley played three years of college basketball for USC, graduating from the school following the 2013–14 season. As a junior in 2013–14, he averaged a team-high 17.8 points and 6.4 rebounds for a USC team that finished 11–21 overall and 2–16 in Pac-12 play. He subsequently took advantage of the NCAA's graduate transfer rule in which players are able to play their final year of eligibility immediately if they have graduated and want to pursue a degree that isn't offered at their current school. In May 2014, he transferred from USC to Gonzaga for the 2014–15 season.

In 2014–15 playing for the Gonzaga Bulldogs, Wesley appeared in 38 games (all starts) and averaged 10.6 points, 4.7 rebounds, 2.3 assists and 26.7 minutes while shooting 51.4 percent from the field. He subsequently earned second-team All-West Coast Conference honors in a season where Gonzaga turned in the best record (35–3) and longest winning streak (22) in program history en route to a top-five national ranking while also leading the nation in field goal percentage.

Professional career
Wesley went undrafted in the 2015 NBA draft. On January 21, 2016, he was acquired by the Sioux Falls Skyforce of the NBA Development League. On January 30, he made his professional debut in a 110–100 loss to the Westchester Knicks, recording two points and one rebound in twelve minutes. He helped the Skyforce finish with a D-League-best 40–10 record in 2015–16, and went on to help the team win the league championship with a 2–1 Finals series win over the Los Angeles D-Fenders.

On August 28, 2016, Wesley signed with Joensuun Kataja of the Finnish Korisliiga, where he averaged 17.5 points in the Finnish League and 14 points in the Basketball Champions League. On December 4, he signed with MKS Dąbrowa Górnicza of the Polish League.

On October 5, 2017, Wesley signed a one-year deal with the Israeli team Hapoel Kfar Saba of the Israeli National League. In 29 games played during the 2017–18 season, he averaged 20.3 points, 7.3 rebounds and 3.5 assists per game.

On November 7, 2018, Wesley returned to Hapoel Kfar Saba for the 2018–19 season.

During summer of 2019, he has signed with KTP Basket  of the Korisliiga.

On January 26, 2021, he has signed with Antibes Sharks of the LNB Pro B.

References

External links

USC Trojans bio
Gonzaga Bulldogs bio

1992 births
Living people
American expatriate basketball people in Bulgaria
American expatriate basketball people in Finland
American expatriate basketball people in Israel
American expatriate basketball people in Poland
American men's basketball players
Basketball players from California
Gonzaga Bulldogs men's basketball players
Hapoel Kfar Saba B.C. players
Kataja BC players
KTP-Basket players
MKS Dąbrowa Górnicza (basketball) players
PBC Academic players
Shooting guards
Sioux Falls Skyforce players
Small forwards
Sportspeople from Monterey, California
USC Trojans men's basketball players